Julien Sicot (born 20 March 1978 in Fort-de-France, Martinique) is a French Olympic freestyle swimmer. He swam for France at the 2004 Summer Olympics, and has been a member of  the French national team since 1997.

He also swam for France at the 2003 and 2007 World Championships.

References

1978 births
Living people
People from Fort-de-France
Martiniquais swimmers
French people of Martiniquais descent
Swimmers at the 2004 Summer Olympics
Olympic swimmers of France
French male freestyle swimmers
World Aquatics Championships medalists in swimming
European Aquatics Championships medalists in swimming
Mediterranean Games gold medalists for France
Swimmers at the 1997 Mediterranean Games
Mediterranean Games medalists in swimming